Deborah Haynes (born October 1976) is a British journalist, security and defence editor at Sky News. She was previously known for her work as defence editor for The Times as well as documenting the dangers Iraqi interpreters faced since British troops withdrew from Iraq.

Biography

Haynes graduated from the University of Cardiff in 1999 with a degree in law and Japanese.

In 1999, she began working as a producer for the British bureau of the Japanese television channel TV Tokyo. Then she worked for Agence France-Presse and Reuters. At the end of May 2018, it was announced that Haynes was to leave The Times to join Sky News as their Foreign Affairs editor. She replaced Sam Kiley who left Sky News that January to join CNN.

Haynes speaks Japanese and French.

Awards 
In 2008, Haynes won the inaugural Bevins Prize and an Amnesty International UK Media Award for her work documenting the dangers that Iraqi interpreters faced after the withdrawal of British troops from the country. She also campaigned for Iraqi interpreters to be allowed to live in the UK. 

She was awarded with an honorary degree from the University of Salford in Greater Manchester in 2011.

References

1970s births
Living people
British women journalists
Year of birth missing (living people)
British journalists
Alumni of Cardiff University
Sky News newsreaders and journalists
The Times people
Reuters people
Agence France-Presse journalists